In geometry, the elongated pentagonal orthobirotunda is one of the Johnson solids. Its Conway polyhedron notation is at5jP5. As the name suggests, it can be constructed by elongating a pentagonal orthobirotunda by inserting a decagonal prism between its congruent halves. Rotating one of the pentagonal rotundae through 36 degrees before inserting the prism yields the elongated pentagonal gyrobirotunda.

Formulae
The following formulae for volume and surface area can be used if all faces are regular, with edge length a:

References

External links
 

Johnson solids